The 1989 Formula One Indoor Trophy took place on December 2–3 at the Bologna Motor Show. The winner was Luis Pérez-Sala in a Minardi-Ford.

Participants

Participation for the second Formula One Indoor Trophy increased from six to seven drivers. Coming at the end of the 1989 Formula One season, it featured five teams.

Osella entered a two-man team, but neither of their regular drivers, Nicola Larini and Piercarlo Ghinzani, drove. Coloni driver Enrico Bertaggia and Swiss driver Andrea Chiesa, who was driving for Roni Motorsport in International Formula 3000 at the time, where their chosen competitors.

BMS Scuderia Italia sent along Andrea de Cesaris with one of their Dallara cars. Their other driver, Alex Caffi, did not attend.

Minardi also sent two drivers, defending champion Luis Pérez-Sala and Pierluigi Martini. Pierre-Henri Raphanel attended for Coloni, although he had been replaced mid season by Bertaggia, who had been poached for this event by Osella.

Results

De Cesaris was given a bye through the quarter finals. Meanwhile, defending champion Pérez-Sala was drawn against Raphanel, Bertaggia against Langes and Martini against Chiesa. Unsurprisingly, the more experienced Pérez-Sala, Bertaggia and Martini went through to the semi finals.

De Cesaris would face Pérez-Sala in the first semi-final in a hard to predict match up, which the Spaniard won. His team mate Pierluigi Martini also won through against Enrico Bertaggia, to create an all-Minardi final. Pérez-Sala won the final to take the title for the second year running.

References

 Bologna Sprint - The GEL Motorsport Information Page

Formula One Indoor Trophy
Formula One Indoor Trophy